Baffle Creek is a rural locality in the Gladstone Region, Queensland, Australia. In the  Baffle Creek had a population of 156 people.

The neighbourhood of Wartburg is within the locality.

History
The area on Baffle Creek was first settled in 1908 by Prussian and German immigrants who were recruited by Apostle. H. F. Niemeyer of the Apostolic Church of Queensland in Hatton Vale near Ipswich. The government land orders they had expected to receive were not available, so they had to wait for six months living on a hill that they called Wartburg meaning waiting place.

In 1911, a sugar mill was built by Albert Kleinschmidt (who had another sugar mill in Bundaberg). The mill produced brown sugar which was taken elsewhere for further refining. The mill was closed in 1919 as it was not a successful venture.

Wartburg State School opened on 11 August 1913.

In 1921, a shop storeroom off the Coast Road was remodelled to become St Paul's Lutheran Church. It was officially opened on Sunday 17 July 1921. It is on the south-western corner of the Coast Road and Bayfield Road leading to the creek. The church bell was installed in 1923. The church was enlarged and the bell tower was remodelled in 1947.

In the 2011 census, the population of Baffle Creek was too low to separately report and was aggregated with the neighbouring locality of Deepwater which had a reported population of 548 people.

In the  Baffle Creek had a population of 156 people.

Geography
Baffle Creek (the watercourse) forms the southern and south-western boundaries.

Heritage listings
Baffle Creek has a number of heritage-listed sites, including:
 Coast Road: Baffle Creek Sugar Mill (remains)
 Coast Road: St Pauls's Lutheran Church

Education
Wartburg State School is a government co-educational primary (P-7) school at 585 Coast Road, Baffle Creek. In 2013, the school had 55 students and 4 teachers (3 full-time equivalent).

References

Further reading
 
 
 

Gladstone Region
Localities in Queensland